Winterhawk was an American heavy metal band formed in 1978 in San Francisco, California. Fronted by lead vocalist, lead guitarist and songwriter Nik "Winterhawk" Alexander (a Cree musician), the band released two albums via Mother Earth records. Their debut album, Electric Warriors (1979), was produced by Tom Bee.

Their second album, Dog Soldier (1980), included drums and backing vocals by blue-eyed soul musician Jon Gibson (who went on to have success in the contemporary Christian music industry). Both Electric Warriors and Dog Soldier were remastered and reissued on Don Giovanni Records in 2021.

Winterhawk was committed to a native anti-drug movement, pioneering an abstinence-through-music platform that ran parallel to the straight edge hardcore movement. Winterhawk performed in the 1983 US Festival and has opened for Tina Turner, Santana, Country Joe and the Fish, Steve Miller and Van Halen. The band separated in 1984. 

After a battle with cancer, Alexander passed away on July 5, 2017.

Discography

Albums

EPs

Personnel 
 Nik Alexander — lead vocals, lead guitar
 Doug Love — bass, backing vocals, percussion
 Alfonso Kolb — drummer
 Frank J. Diaz de Leon — bass guitar
 Frankie Joe — rhythm guitar
 Gordon Campbell — trombone, bells
 Jon Gibson — drums, backing vocals

References 

Musical groups established in 1978
Native American musical groups
Don Giovanni Records artists